Geir Andersen (born February 12, 1964) is a Norwegian nordic combined skier who competed from 1983 to 1989. He won three medals at the FIS Nordic World Ski Championships with one gold (1984: 3 x 10 km team) and two silvers (1985: 15 km individual, 3 x 10 km team).

Andersen also finished 10th in the individual event at the 1984 Winter Olympics in Sarajevo. He had six individual victories in his career from 1984 to 1985.

External links

Norwegian male Nordic combined skiers
1964 births
Living people
Olympic Nordic combined skiers of Norway
Nordic combined skiers at the 1984 Winter Olympics
FIS Nordic Combined World Cup winners
FIS Nordic World Ski Championships medalists in Nordic combined
20th-century Norwegian people